Bhakti means "attachment, participation, fondness for, homage, faith, love, devotion, worship, purity". It was originally used in Hinduism, referring to devotion and love for a personal god or a representational god by a devotee. In ancient texts such as the Shvetashvatara Upanishad, the term simply means participation, devotion and love for any endeavor, while in the Bhagavad Gita, it connotes one of the possible paths of spirituality and towards moksha, as in bhakti marga.

Bhakti in Indian religions is "emotional devotionalism", particularly to a personal god or to spiritual ideas. Thus, bhakti requires a relationship between the devotee and the deity. The term also refers to a movement, pioneered by Alvars and Nayanars, that developed around the gods Vishnu (Vaishnavism), Shiva (Shaivism) and Devi (Shaktism) in the second half of the 1st millennium CE.

Bhakti ideas have inspired many popular texts and saint-poets in India. The Bhagavata Purana, for example, is a Krishna-related text associated with the Bhakti movement in Hinduism. Bhakti is also found in other religions practiced in India, and it has influenced interactions between Christianity and Hinduism in the modern era. Nirguni bhakti (devotion to the divine without attributes) is found in Sikhism, as well as Hinduism. Outside India, emotional devotion is found in some Southeast Asian and East Asian Buddhist traditions, and it is sometimes referred to as Bhatti.

Terminology 
The Sanskrit word bhakti is derived from the verb root bhaj-, which means "to worship, have recourse to, betake onself to"  or bhañj-, which means "to break." The word also means "attachment, devotion to, fondness for, homage, faith or love, worship, piety to something as a spiritual, religious principle or means of salvation".

The meaning of the term Bhakti is analogous to but different from Kama. Kama connotes emotional connection, sometimes with sensual devotion and erotic love. Bhakti, in contrast, is spiritual, a love and devotion to religious concepts or principles, that engages both emotion and intellection. Karen Pechelis states that the word Bhakti should not be understood as uncritical emotion, but as committed engagement. She adds that, in the concept of bhakti in Hinduism, the engagement involves a simultaneous tension between emotion  and intellection, "emotion to reaffirm the social context and temporal freedom, intellection to ground the experience in a thoughtful, conscious approach". One who practices bhakti is called a bhakta.

The term bhakti, in Vedic Sanskrit literature, has a general meaning of "mutual attachment, devotion, fondness for, devotion to" such as in human relationships, most often between beloved-lover, friend-friend, king-subject, parent-child. It may refer to devotion towards a spiritual teacher (Guru) as guru-bhakti, or to a personal God, or for spirituality without form (nirguna).

According to the Sri Lankan Buddhist scholar Sanath Nanayakkara, there is no single term in English that adequately translates or represents the concept of bhakti in Indian religions. Terms such as "devotion, faith, devotional faith" represent certain aspects of bhakti, but it means much more. The concept includes a sense of deep affection, attachment, but not wish because "wish is selfish, affection is unselfish". Some scholars, states Nanayakkara, associate it with saddha (Sanskrit: Sraddha) which means "faith, trust or confidence". However, bhakti can connote an end in itself, or a path to spiritual wisdom.

The term Bhakti refers to one of several alternate spiritual paths to moksha (spiritual freedom, liberation, salvation) in Hinduism, and it is referred to as bhakti marga or bhakti yoga. The other paths are Jnana marga (path of knowledge), Karma marga (path of works), Rāja marga (path of contemplation and meditation).

The term bhakti has been usually translated as "devotion" in Orientalist literature. The colonial era authors variously described Bhakti as a form of mysticism or "primitive" religious devotion of lay people with monotheistic parallels. However, modern scholars state "devotion" is a misleading and incomplete translation of bhakti. Many contemporary scholars have questioned this terminology, and most now trace the term bhakti as one of the several spiritual perspectives that emerged from reflections on the Vedic context and Hindu way of life. Bhakti in Indian religions is not a ritualistic devotion to a God or to religion, but participation in a path that includes behavior, ethics, mores and spirituality. It involves, among other things, refining one's state of mind, knowing God, participating in God, and internalizing God. Increasingly, instead of "devotion", the term "participation" is appearing in scholarly literature as a gloss for the term bhakti.

David Lorenzen states that bhakti is an important term in Sikhism and Hinduism. They both share numerous concepts and core spiritual ideas, but bhakti of nirguni (devotion to divine without attributes) is particularly significant in Sikhism. In Hinduism, diverse ideas continue, where both saguni and nirguni bhakti (devotion to divine with or without attributes) or alternate paths to spirituality are among the options left to the choice of a Hindu.

History

The Upanishads 
The last of three epilogue verses of the Shvetashvatara Upanishad, dated to be from 1st millennium BCE, uses the word Bhakti as follows,

This verse is one of the earliest use of the word Bhakti in ancient Indian literature, and has been translated as "the love of God". Scholars have debated whether this phrase is authentic or later insertion into the Upanishad, and whether the terms "Bhakti" and "Deva" meant the same in this ancient text as they do in the modern era. Max Muller states that the word Bhakti appears only once in this Upanishad, that too in one last verse of the epilogue, could have been a later addition and may not be theistic as the word was later used in much later Sandilya Sutras. Grierson as well as Carus note that the first epilogue verse 6.21 of the Shvetashvatara Upanishad is also notable for its use of the word Deva Prasada (देवप्रसाद, grace or gift of God), but add that Deva in the epilogue of the Shvetashvatara Upanishad refers to "pantheistic Brahman" and the closing credit to sage Shvetashvatara in verse 6.21 can mean "gift or grace of his Soul".

Post-Vedic movement

Scholarly consensus sees bhakti as a post-Vedic movement that developed primarily during the Hindu Epics and Puranas era of Indian history (late first mill. BCE-early first mill. CE). The Bhagavad Gita is the first text to explicitly use the word "bhakti" to designate a religious path, using it as a term for one of three possible religious approaches. The Bhagavata Purana develops the idea more elaborately, while the Shvetashvatara Upanishad presents evidence of guru-bhakti (devotion to one's spiritual teacher).

Bhakti movement 

The Bhakti Movement was a rapid growth of bhakti, first starting in the later part of 1st millennium CE, from Tamil Nadu in southern India with the Shaiva Nayanars and the Vaishnava Alvars. Their ideas and practices inspired bhakti poetry and devotion throughout India over the 12th-18th century CE. The Alvars ("those immersed in God") were Vaishnava poet-saints who wandered from temple to temple, singing the praises of Vishnu. They hailed the divine abodes of Vishnu and converted many people to Vaishnavism.

Like the Alvars, the Shaiva Nayanar poets were influential. The Tirumurai, a compilation of hymns by sixty-three Nayanar poets, is still of great importance in South India. Hymns by three of the most prominent poets, Appar (7th century CE), Campantar (7th century) and Sundarar (9th century), were compiled into the Tevaram, the first volumes of the Tirumurai. The poets' itinerant lifestyle helped create temple and pilgrimage sites and spread devotion to Shiva. Early Tamil-Shiva bhakti poets quoted the Krishna Yajurveda. The Alvars and Nayanars were instrumental in propagating the Bhakti tradition. The Bhagavata Purana's references to the South Indian Alvar saints, along with its emphasis on bhakti, have led many scholars to give it South Indian origins, though some scholars question whether this evidence excludes the possibility that bhakti movement had parallel developments in other parts of India.

Scholars state that the bhakti movement focused on the gods Vishnu, Shiva, Shakti and other deities, that developed and spread in India, was in response to the arrival of Islam in India about 8th century CE, and subsequent religious violence. This view is contested by other scholars.

The Bhakti movement swept over east and north India from the fifteenth-century onwards, reaching its zenith between the 15th and 17th century CE. Bhakti poetry and ideas influenced many aspects of Hindu culture, religious and secular, and became an integral part of Indian society. It extended its influence to Sufism, Christianity, and Jainism. Sikhism was founded by Nanak in the 15th century, during the bhakti movement period, and scholars call it a Bhakti sect of Indian traditions.

The movement has traditionally been considered as an influential social reformation in Hinduism, and provided an individual-focused alternative path to spirituality regardless of one's birth caste or gender. Postmodern scholars question this traditional view and whether the Bhakti movement were ever a social reform or rebellion of any kind. They suggest Bhakti movement was a revival, reworking and recontextualization of ancient Vedic traditions.

Types and classifications

Bhakti Yoga 

The Bhagavad Gita, variously dated to have been composed in 5th to 2nd century BCE, introduces bhakti yoga in combination with karma yoga and jnana yoga, while the Bhagavata Purana expands on bhakti yoga, offering nine specific activities for the bhakti yogi. Bhakti in the Bhagavad Gita offered an alternative to two dominant practices of religion at the time: the isolation of the sannyasin and the practice of religious ritual. Bhakti Yoga is described by Swami Vivekananda as "the path of systematized devotion for the attainment of union with the Absolute". In various chapters, including the twelfth chapter of the Bhagavad Gita, Krishna describes bhakti yoga as one of the paths to the highest spiritual attainments. In the sixth chapter, for example, the Gita states the following about bhakti yogi:

Shandilya and Narada produced two important Bhakti texts, the Shandilya Bhakti Sutra and Narada Bhakti Sutra. They define devotion, emphasize its importance and superiority, and classify its forms.

According to Ramana Maharishi, states David Frawley, bhakti is a "surrender to the divine with one's heart". It can be practiced as an adjunct to self-inquiry, and in one of four ways:
 Atma-Bhakti: devotion to the one's atma (Supreme Self)
 Ishvara-Bhakti: devotion to a formless being (God, Cosmic Lord)
 Ishta Devata-Bhakti: devotion to a personal God or goddess
 Guru-Bhakti: devotion to Guru

Bhagavata Purana and Navaratnamalika 
The Navaratnamalika (garland of nine gems), nine forms of bhakti are listed: (1) śravaṇa (listening to ancient texts), (2) kīrtana (praying), (3) smaraṇa (remembering teachings in ancient texts), (4) pāda-sevana (service to the feet), (5) archana (worshiping), (6) namaskar or vandana (bowing to the divine), (7) dāsya (service to the divine), (8) sākhyatva (friendship with the divine), and (9) ātma-nivedana (self-surrender to the divine).

The Bhagavata Purana teaches nine similar facets of bhakti.

Bhavas 
Traditional Hinduism speaks of five different bhāvas or "affective essences". In this sense, bhāvas are different attitudes that a devotee takes according to his individual temperament to express his devotion towards God in some form. The different bhāvas are:
 śānta, placid love for God;
 dāsya, the attitude of a servant;
 sakhya, the attitude of a friend;
 vātsalya, the attitude of a mother towards her child;
 madhurya, the attitude of a woman towards her lover.

Several saints are known to have practiced these bhavas. The nineteenth century mystic, Ramakrishna is said to have practiced these five bhavas. The attitude of Hanuman towards lord Rama is considered to be of dasya bhava. The attitude of Arjuna and the shepherd boys of Vrindavan towards Krishna  is regarded as sakhya bhava. The attitude of Radha towards Krishna is regarded as madhura bhava. The attitude of Yashoda, who looked after Krishna during his childhood is regarded as vatsalya bhava. Caitanya-caritamrta mentions that Mahaprabhu came to distribute the four spiritual sentiments of Vraja loka: dasya, sakhya, vatsalya, and sringara. Sringara is the relationship of the intimate love.

Related practices in other religions 
In olden days, saints such as Mirabai, Soordas, Narsinh Mehta composed several bhajans that were a path towards Bhakti for many, that are universally sung even today. A modern age saint, Shri Devendra Ghia (Kaka) has composed about 10,000 hymns (a phenomenal task.) These hymns are related to bhakti, knowledge, devotion, faith, introspection and honesty.

Devotionalism, similar to Bhakti, states Michael Pasquier, has been a common form of religious activity in world religions throughout human history. It is found in Christianity, Islam, Buddhism and Judaism.

Buddhism 

Bhakti (called bhatti in Pali language) has been a common aspect of Buddhism, where offerings and group prayers are made to images such the images of the Buddha and the Bodhisattvas, or to deities such as wrathful deities. Karel Werner notes that Bhakti has been a significant practice in Theravada Buddhism, and states, "there can be no doubt that deep devotion or bhakti / bhatti does exist in Buddhism and that it had its beginnings in the earliest days".

According to Sri Lankan scholar Indumathie Karunaratna, the meaning of bhatti changed throughout Buddhist history, however. In early Buddhism, such as in the text Theragāthā, bhatti had the meaning of 'faithful adherence to the [Buddhist] religion', and was accompanied with knowledge. In later text tradition, however, the term developed the meaning of an advanced form of emotional devotion. Examples of the latter include the veneration of Buddha Amitabha and those in the Saddharmapundrarika Sutra. This changed the meaning of Buddhist devotion to a more person-centered sense, similar to a theist sense used in Hindu scriptures. This sense of devotion was no longer connected with a belief in a religious system, and had little place for doubt, contradicting the early Buddhist concept of saddhā. Saddhā did not exclude reasonable doubt on the spiritual path, and was a step in reaching the final aim of developing wisdom, not an end in itself.

In early Buddhism, states Sanath Nanayakkara, the concept of taking refuge to the Buddha had the meaning of taking the Buddha as an ideal to live by, rather than the later sense of self-surrender. But already in the Commentary to the Abhidhamma text Puggalapaññatti, it is mentioned that the Buddhist devotee should develop his saddhā until it becomes bhaddi, a sense not mentioned in earlier texts and probably influenced by the Hindu idea of bhakti. There are instances where commentator Buddhaghosa mentions taking refuge in the Buddha in the sense of mere adoration, indicating a historical shift in meaning. Similar developments took place with regard to the term puja (honor) and the role of the Buddha image. In Mahāyāna Buddhism, the doctrine of the trikāya (three bodies) and the devotion towards Bodhisattvas all indicating a shift of emphasis toward devotion as a central concept in later Buddhism.

In later faith-oriented literature, such as the Avadānas, faith is given an important role in Buddhist doctrine. Nevertheless, faith (śraddhā) is discussed in different contexts than devotion (bhakti). Bhakti is often used disparagingly to describe acts of worship to deities, often seen as ineffective and improper for a Buddhist. Also, bhakti is clearly connected with a person as an object, whereas śraddhā is less connected with a person, and is more connected with truthfulness and truth. Śraddhā focuses on ideas such as the working of karma and merit transfer.

Nevertheless, affective devotion is an important part of Buddhist practice, not only in Mahāyāna Buddhism. According to Winston King, a scholar on Theravāda Buddhism in Myanmar, "warm, personalized, emotional" bhakti has been a part of the Burmese Buddhist tradition apart from the monastic and lay intellectuals. The Buddha is treasured by the everyday devout Buddhists, just like Catholics treasure Jesus. The orthodox teachers tend to restrain the devotion to the Buddha, but to the devout Buddhist populace, "a very deeply devotional quality" was and remains a part of the actual practice. This is observable, states King, in "multitudes of Pagoda worshippers of the Buddha images" and the offerings they make before the image and nowhere else. Another example is the worship of the Bodhisattvas and various deities in Tibetan and other traditions of Buddhism, including the so-called wrathful deities.

Jainism 
Bhakti has been a prevalent ancient practice in various Jaina sects, wherein learned Tirthankara (Jina) and human gurus have been venerated with offerings, songs and Āratī prayers.

Jainism participated in the Bhakti school of medieval India, and has a rich tradition of bhakti literature (stavan) though these have been less studied than those of the Hindu tradition. The Avasyaka sutra of Jains includes, among ethical duties for the devotee, the recitation of "hymns of praise to the Tirthankaras" as the second Obligatory Action. It explains this bhakti as one of the means to destroy negative karma. According to Paul Dundas, such textual references to devotional activity suggests that bhakti was a necessary part of Jainism from an early period.

According to Jeffery D. Long, along with its strong focus on ethics and ascetic practices, the religiosity in Jainism has had a strong tradition of bhakti or devotion just like their Hindu counterparts. The Jain community built ornate temples and prided in public devotion for its fordmakers, saints and teachers. Abhisekha, festival prayers, community recitals and Murti puja (rituals before an image) are examples of integrated bhakti in Jain practice. Some Jain monks, however, reject Bhakti.

See also 
Buddhist chant
Buddhist devotion
Awgatha - Burmese Buddhist Devotion
Novena – a form of devotion to Blessed Mary, Christ or a saint in Christianity over nine successive days or weeks
Kavanah – intention, devotion during prayer in Judaism
Mettā
Ravidassia religion
Shaiva Siddhanta
Bhakti movement

References

Sources

Further reading 
Swami Chinmayananda, Love Divine – Narada Bhakti Sutra, Chinmaya Publications Trust, Madras, 1970
Swami Tapasyananda, Bhakti Schools of Vedanta, Sri Ramakrishna Math, Madras, 1990
A.C. Bhaktivedanta Swami Prabhupada, Srimad Bhagavatam (12 Cantos), The Bhaktivedanta Book Trust,2004
Steven J. Rosen, The Yoga of Kirtan: conversations on the Sacred Art of Chanting (New York: FOLK Books, 2008)

External links 

Bhakti Poets: A History of Bhakti by Doris Jakobsh
The full text of the Bhagavata Purana (Srimad-Bhagavatam)
English Translation of Narada Bhakti Sutra
Hindu and Christian Bhakti: A Common Human Response to the Sacred, DC Scott (1980), Indian Journal of Theology, 29(1), pages12-32
Author and authority in the Bhakti poetry of north India, JS Hawley (1988), The Journal of Asian Studies, 47(02), pages 269–290.
The politics of nonduality: Reassessing the work of transcendence in modern Sikh theology (Nirguni Bhakti), A Mandair (2006), Journal of the American Academy of Religion, 74(3), pages 646–673.
Bhakti, Buddhism and the Bhagavad-Gita Rob Reed (1977), Wichita, United States

The Transforming Gift: An Analysis of Devotional Acts of Offering in Buddhist "Avadāna" Literature, John Strong (1979), History of Religions, 18(3) (Feb., 1979), pages 221–237.

Hindu philosophical concepts

Meditation
Hindu practices
Sanskrit words and phrases
Yoga styles
Yoga concepts